Richard Howard Stafford Crossman  (15 December 1907 – 5 April 1974) was a British Labour Party politician. A university classics lecturer by profession, he was elected a Member of Parliament in 1945 and became a significant figure among the party's advocates of Zionism. He was a Bevanite on the left of the party, and a long-serving member of Labour's National Executive Committee (NEC) from 1952.

Crossman was a Cabinet minister in Harold Wilson's governments of 1964–1970, first for Housing, then as Leader of the House of Commons, and then for Social Services. In the early 1970s Crossman was editor of the New Statesman. He is remembered for his highly revealing three-volume Diaries of a Cabinet Minister, published posthumously.

Early life
Crossman was born in Bayswater, London, the son of Charles Stafford Crossman, a barrister and later a High Court judge, and Helen Elizabeth (née Howard). Helen was of the Howard family of Ilford descended from Luke Howard, a Quaker chemist and meteorologist who founded the pharmaceutical company Howards and Sons.

Crossman grew up in Buckhurst Hill, Essex, and was educated at Twyford School, and at Winchester College (although these scholarships were abolished in 1857, he was 'founder's kin', being descended from William of Wykeham through John Danvers, one of his father's ancestors), where he became head boy. He excelled academically and on the football field. He studied Classics at New College, Oxford, where he was friendly with W.H. Auden. He received a double first and became a fellow in 1931. He taught philosophy at the university before becoming a lecturer for the Workers' Educational Association. He was a councillor on Oxford City Council, and became head of its Labour group in 1935.

Personal life

Crossman, who had been noted for his good looks as a youth, had same-sex affairs at Oxford. In an early diary, he describes an Easter holiday with an unnamed young poet "who kept me in a little whitewashed room for a fortnight as his mouth was against mine and we were completely together."

After being married to Erika Glück, a divorcée, who he met while travelling in Germany after graduation, he married Zita Baker (ex-wife of John Baker) in 1937.

Service in World War II and afterwards
At the outbreak of the Second World War Crossman joined the Political Warfare Executive under Robert Bruce Lockhart, where he headed the German Section. He produced anti-Nazi propaganda broadcasts for Radio of the European Revolution, set up by the Special Operations Executive (SOE). He eventually became Assistant Chief of the Psychological Warfare Division of SHAEF and was awarded an OBE for his wartime service. In April 1945, Crossman was one of the first  British officers to enter the former Dachau concentration camp. With war correspondent Colin Wills, Crossman co-wrote the script for German Concentration Camps Factual Survey, a British government documentary, produced by Sidney Bernstein with treatment advice by Alfred Hitchcock, that showed gruelling scenes from Nazi concentration camps. The uncompleted film was shelved for decades before being assembled by scholars at the Imperial War Museum and released in 2014. That same year, German Concentration Camps Factual Survey was itself the subject of a documentary, Night Will Fall.

Crossman became a key participant in the annual Königswinter Conference, organised by Lilo Milchsack to bring together British and German legislators, academics and opinion-formers from 1950 onwards. The conferences were credited with helping to heal bad memories created by the war. At them, Crossman met the German politician Hans von Herwarth, the ex-soldier Fridolin von Senger und Etterlin, future German President Richard von Weizsäcker and other leading German decision makers. Other attendees at the conferences included Denis Healey, soon to become a Labour Party politician, and Robin Day, later a political broadcaster.

Political career: 1945–51
Crossman entered the House of Commons at the 1945 general election as the Member of Parliament (MP) for Coventry East, a seat he held until shortly before he died in 1974. During 1945–46 he served, on the nomination of the Foreign Secretary Ernest Bevin, as a member of the Anglo-American Committee of Inquiry into the Problems of European Jewry and Palestine. The committee's report, submitted in April 1946, included a recommendation for 100,000 Jewish displaced persons to be permitted to enter Palestine. Short of American financial and military assistance, the British government refused to implement the report's recommendations. Thereafter Crossman led the socialist opposition to the official British policy for Palestine. That incurred Bevin's enmity, and may have been the primary factor which prevented Crossman from achieving ministerial rank during the 1945–51 government. Crossman initially supported the Arab cause, but after meeting Chaim Weizmann he became a lifelong Zionist. In his diary, he described Weizmann as "one of the very few great men I have ever met." Crossman remained a supporter of Israel during his political career from the late-1940s until he died in 1974.

Crossman cemented his role as a leader of the left-wing of the Parliamentary Labour Party in 1947 by co-authoring the Keep Left pamphlet, and later became one of the more prominent Bevanites.

Anti-communist propaganda
Crossman is considered by historians to be a central figure to British Cold War propaganda due to his collaboration with the Information Research Department (IRD), a secret branch of the UK Foreign Office dedicated to disinformation, anti-communist, and pro-colonial propaganda during the Cold War. The IRD secretly funded, published and distributed many of Crossman's articles and books, including The God that Failed. His anti-communist works were not only of special interest to British propagandists but were also secretly sponsored by the US government, which translated his works into Malay and Chinese. Crossman was also a regular contributor to Encounter, an "anti-Stalinist" publication which received funding from MI6 and the CIA.

Crossman's intense relationship with disinformation for propaganda purposes led to many people nicknaming him "Dick Double-Crossman". His name was also included within one of George Orwell's notebooks following the discovery of Orwell's list, being noted by Orwell as being "Too dishonest to be outright F. T" (fellow-traveller).

Political career: 1951–70
He was a member of the National Executive Committee of the Labour Party from 1952 until 1967, and Chairman of the Labour Party in 1960–61.

In 1957, Crossman was one of the plaintiffs, along with Aneurin Bevan and Morgan Phillips, in a claim for libel made against The Spectator, which had described the three men as drinking heavily during a socialist conference in Italy. Having sworn that the charges were untrue, the three collected damages from the magazine. Many years later, Crossman's posthumously published diaries confirmed that The Spectators charges had been true and that all three of them had perjured themselves.

Crossman was Labour's spokesman on education before the 1964 general election, but upon forming the new Government Harold Wilson appointed him to the Cabinet as Minister of Housing and Local Government. In 1966, Crossman became Lord President of the Council and Leader of the House of Commons.

Between 1968 and 1970, he was the first Secretary of State for Health and Social Services, in which position he worked on an ambitious proposal to supplement Britain's flat-rate state pension with an earnings-related element. The proposal had not, however, been passed into law at the time the Labour Party lost the 1970 general election. During the months of political turmoil that led up to the election loss, Crossman had been considered, however briefly, as a last-minute option to replace Wilson as Prime Minister.

Books and journalism
After Labour's general election defeat in 1970, Crossman resigned from the Labour front bench to become editor of the New Statesman, where he had been a frequent contributor and assistant editor from 1938 until 1955. He left the New Statesman in 1972.

In the 1950s and 1960s, Crossman also had a regular column titled "Crossman Says..." in the Daily Mirror, the Labour-supporting tabloid newspaper. Along with the column of 'Cassandra', Crossman's reporting provided the bulk of political and international commentary in the newspaper.

Crossman was a prolific writer and editor. In Plato To-Day (1937) he imagines Plato visiting Nazi Germany and Stalinist Russia. Plato criticises Nazi and Communist politicians for misusing the ideas he had set forth in the Republic. After the war, Crossman edited The God That Failed (1949), a collection of anti-Communist essays by former Communists.

Crossman is best remembered for his colourful and highly subjective three-volume Diaries of a Cabinet Minister, written while he was living in Vincent Square, published posthumously from 1975 to 1977 and covering his time in government from 1964 to 1970. The diaries appeared after he had died, and following a legal battle by the government to block publication. One of Crossman's legal executors was Michael Foot, then a cabinet minister, who opposed his own government's attempts to suppress the diaries. Among other things, the diaries describe Crossman's battles with "the Dame", his Permanent Secretary Evelyn Sharp, GBE (1903–1985), the first woman in Britain to hold the position. Crossman's backbench diaries were published in 1981. Crossman's diaries were an acknowledged source for the television comedy series Yes Minister.

Death
Crossman died of liver cancer on 5 April 1974 at his home in Oxfordshire. He was survived by his third wife, Anne Patricia (15 April 1920 – 3 October 2008; née McDougall, daughter of Patrick McDougall, of Prescote Manor, Cropredy, founder of the Banbury cattle market), with whom he shared common descent from the Danvers family of Cropredy. Anne Crossman worked at Bletchley Park during the Second World War, and served as secretary to Maurice Edelman MP. The Crossmans had two children, Patrick and Virginia.

Legacy 

The Richard Crossman Building, built in 1971, at Coventry University is named in his honour.

Published works
 Government and the Governed (A History of Political Ideas and Political Practice) London: Cristophers (1939)
 Plato To-Day New York: Oxford University Press (1939)
 Palestine Mission: A Personal Record New York: Harper (1947)
 The God That Failed New York: Harper (1949) (editor)
 The Charm of Politics, and other Essays in Political Criticism Hamish Hamilton (1958)
 A Nation Reborn: The Israel of Weizmann, Bevin and Ben-Gurion New York: Atheneum (1960)
 The Politics of Socialism New York: Atheneum (1965)
 The Myths of Cabinet Government Cambridge: Harvard University Press (1972)
 Diaries of a Cabinet Minister (three volumes, 1975, 1976 and 1977)
 The Backbench Diaries of Richard Crossman (1981)

Biographies
Anthony Howard (1990), Crossman: The Pursuit of Power, Jonathan Cape
Tam Dalyell (1989), Dick Crossman: A Portrait
Victoria Honeyman (2006), Richard Crossman; A Reforming Radical of the Labour Party, I.B. Tauris

References

External links

 
Richard Crossman (1907–1974), Politician National Portrait Gallery, London
On Richard Crossman  CliveJames.com
Catalogue of Crossman's papers, held at the Modern Records Centre, University of Warwick
Collection of Crossman's papers available digitally, held at the Modern Records Centre, University of Warwick
 

|-

|-

|-

|-

|-

|-

|-

1907 births
1974 deaths
20th-century British journalists
20th-century English male writers
20th-century English non-fiction writers
20th-century English LGBT people
20th-century diarists
Alumni of New College, Oxford
Bisexual men
Bisexual politicians
British Secretaries of State
British Zionists
British anti-communists
British magazine editors
British republicans
Chairs of the Labour Party (UK)
Deaths from cancer in England
Deaths from liver cancer
English diarists
English political writers
European democratic socialists
LGBT members of the Parliament of the United Kingdom
English LGBT politicians
Labour Party (UK) MPs for English constituencies
Leaders of the House of Commons of the United Kingdom
Lord Presidents of the Council
Members of Oxford City Council
Members of the Fabian Society
Members of the Privy Council of the United Kingdom
Ministers in the Wilson governments, 1964–1970
New Statesman people
Officers of the Order of the British Empire
People educated at Twyford School
People educated at Winchester College
People from Buckhurst Hill
Secretaries of State for Health and Social Services
UK MPs 1945–1950
UK MPs 1950–1951
UK MPs 1951–1955
UK MPs 1955–1959
UK MPs 1959–1964
UK MPs 1964–1966
UK MPs 1966–1970
UK MPs 1970–1974
Writers from London